Margit Sutrop (née Mikelsaar, 13 October 1963) is an Estonian philosopher, ethicist, academic, and politician. She is a member of XIV Riigikogu.

She was born in Tartu. In 1989, she graduated from the University of Tartu (journalism), and in 1991 (philosophy).
She is married to Urmas Sutrop.

Awards
 2010 Order of the White Star, IV class
 2006
 2013 Tartu University Small Medal
 2019 Tartu University Grand Medal

Selected publications
 "Teadus ja teadmistepõhine ühiskond", 2005 (with Urmas Sutrop)
 "Eesti Vabariigi naisministrid. Koguteos naistest poliitika tipus", 2007 (with Kristi Lõuk and Toomas Kiho)
 "Eetikakoodeksite käsiraamat", 2007 (co-author)
 "Mõtestatud Eesti – ühiseid väärtusi hoides", 2008 (with Triin Pisuke)
 "Eetika teadustes ja ühiskonnas. Tartu Ülikooli eetikakeskus 10", 2011 (with Triin Käpp; also in English)
 "Väärtuspõhine kool. Eesti ja maailma kogemus", 2013
 "Eetikakoodeksid. Väärtused, normid ja eetilised dilemmad", 2016 
 "Marika Mikelsaar. Multiresistentne Mamma Bakter", 2008 (co-author)

References

Living people
1963 births
Estonian philosophers
21st-century Estonian politicians
Members of the Riigikogu, 2019–2023
Women members of the Riigikogu
Estonian Reform Party politicians
Recipients of the Order of the White Star, 4th Class
Miina Härma Gymnasium alumni
University of Tartu alumni
Academic staff of the University of Tartu
Politicians from Tartu